Yeo Valley is a UK organic brand established in 1994. The Yeo Valley Organic range includes organic yogurt, cream, milk, butter, cheese, ice cream and compote. The headquarters are located in Somerset, UK, and the Yeo Valley corporation is owned by the Mead family. The Mead family can trace their farming roots back to the 15th century and farm 2,000 acres of land across the Mendip Hills in Somerset, which includes their own herd of British Friesian cows, two organic farms, and the 6.5 acre Yeo Valley Organic Garden, which is open to the public. In 2020 Yeo Valley Organic was the 48th biggest grocery brand in the UK, according to The Grocer and the third largest yogurt brand in the UK.

History

Yeo Valley founders Roger and Mary Mead began making yogurt using milk from their dairy herd at Holt Farm, Blagdon in 1974, selling it from the gate of their farm and to local shops. The present owner is their son, Tim Mead, who took over in 1990, when Roger Mead died in a farming accident.

Production of organic yogurt was started in 1993, as local farmers who were producing organic milk had difficulty finding a consistent demand for it. Yeo Valley encouraged more local farmers to become organic and to form a co-operative by guaranteeing to buy their products to cope with growing demand. The brand has won awards for product quality and innovation and a Queen's Award for Enterprise, presented in 2001, for the revolutionary way it worked with its farming suppliers, encouraging them to turn organic and giving them long-term fair trade contracts. The firm won another Queen's Award for Enterprise for sustainable development in 2006 for its "Approach to management with continuing support for sustainable UK organic farming thereby minimizing environmental impact."

In 2010 they launched a £5 million advertising campaign, created by Bartle Bogle Hegarty, featuring the Yeo Valley Rap, using commercial breaks in The X Factor finals, which went viral. Their follow-up campaign which featured a spoof boy band, The Churned, launched during the first X Factor live show on 8 October 2011. They subsequently released the single "Forever" on iTunes and ran a karaoke-style competition on their Facebook page, where the winner appeared on their final ad during the X Factor final.

In March 2012, the business was re-branded as "Yeo Valley Family Farm" by Perry Haydn Taylor's agency Big Fish who redesigned their range of over 145 products, relaunched their digital communications and introduced a sales promotion plan. Their new brand identity changed from a droplet of milk to a heart with the words "Yeo Valley Family Farm" and the strapline "Supporting British Family Farms" beneath it.

Co-founder Mary Mead was awarded an OBE for services to sustainable dairy farming in the 2012 New Year's Honours List. In 2015, Mary Mead was presented with the Royal Association of British Dairy Farmers’ Princess Royal Award by Her Royal Highness at Buckingham Palace. The honour was made for her outstanding services to the UK dairy industry. Her achievements in the farming industry also include an Honorary Master of Arts Degree from the University of Bristol and a BBC Radio 4 Food and Farming Awards Farmer of the Year.

In 2018, the subsidiary Yeo Valley Dairies Ltd was purchased by Arla Foods UK, transferring the licence to produce milk, butter, spreads, and cheese under the Yeo Valley Organic brand to Arla. Yeo Valley remains a family-owned farming and dairy business. Production of Yeo Valley Organic yogurt, ice cream, cream and desserts remain with Yeo Valley Production in Somerset. Yeo Valley Production employs over 1,600 staff across sites in the West Country. In March 2020, a 20% share of Yeo Valley Production was placed into an Employee Benefit Trust. This means that everyone working at Yeo Valley Production is eligible for an annual bonus, based on company performance, according to the firms website.

Yeo Valley Group invested in one acre of solar panels on the roof of its Holt Farm Dairy in Blagdon, Somerset. The installation of a 500 kW solar array has the potential to generate energy for up to 225 homes and produced enough energy, on average, for 140 houses. The company has installed solar panels across its other manufacturing sites including Crewkerne and 3,300 solar panels at its site in Highbridge as part of its long-term sustainable business plan. The £1million installation in 2021 at the company's Isleport Distribution Centre is the company's second major solar project growing its renewable energy production, with a further £5million being spent across the next five years.

In 2019, the Yeo Valley Organic brand celebrated its 25th birthday. Tim Mead stated in an interview to The Telegraph newspaper that he's only just getting started. In 2021, Yeo Valley starred in BBC Two's Inside the Factory with Gregg Wallace.

Yeo Valley Organic has been voted the nation's ‘favourite organic brand’ by Good Housekeeping readers, retaining the title in the magazine's 2021 Food Awards.

Products
Yeo Valley is the largest organic dairy company in the UK, producing over 2,000 tonnes of yogurt, butter, milk and ice cream each week. The Yeo Valley brand continues to grow and the range now includes: Yogurt (fruity, low fat, Greek style, Kefir varieties) as well as its natural and fruited Super Thick variety, milk, butter, cheese and children's products (Little Yeos), as well as creams, ice cream and compote.

They also sell a variety of yogurt-type and yogurt-base products in grocery stores across UK. A full list of these products include:

 Organic dips
 Organic kefir yogurt
 Organic yogurt (original)
 Organic drinking kefir
 Organic soup
 Greek-style yogurt
 Organic milk (bottled)
 Organic milk (cartoned)
 Super thick yogurt
 Snack yogurt cups
 Snack yogurt pouches
 No-sugar yogurt.
 Organic butter
 Organic cheese
 Organic ice cream
 Frozen kefir
 Organic cream
 Sweet fresh cream

Notes and sources
Notes

Sources

External links
Yeo Valley website

1993 establishments in the United Kingdom
Brand name yogurts
Companies based in Somerset
Dairy products companies of the United Kingdom
Food and drink companies established in 1993
North Somerset